Emil Godlewski (1847–1930) was a Polish botanist. Professor of the Jagiellonian University in Kraków, he was one of the key figures responsible for developing the field of botany in Poland.

One of his collaborators was the Polish botanist Gabriela Balicka-Iwanowska, Ph.D.

References

 The life of Emil Godlewski-Sen. (1847-1930) - a pioneer of Polish plant physiology

1847 births
1930 deaths
19th-century Polish botanists
Academic staff of Jagiellonian University
20th-century Polish botanists